Claude Teisseire (Nickname The Rat) is a French former professional rugby league footballer who represented France at the 1954 Rugby League World Cup. Although he could not take part to the 1951 tour of Australia and New Zealand due to a knee injury, he took part to the 1955 tour which concluded with two wins in three test matches. At club level, he played for AS Carcassonne and Lézignan. For many years, he formed a formidable centre combination with Gilbert Benausse. Later, he became a rugby union coach and referee.

Career
Teisseire, while playing for Carcassonne, was called up for the first edition of the Rugby League World Cup in 1954, which was played in France. He took part to three matches of the tournament, including the final against Great Britain on 13 November 1954 at Parc des Princes in Paris in front of 30,368 spectators, won by Great Britain.

During his sports career, several rugby union clubs tried to sign him, such as Castres, Narbonne or Mazamet, but unsuccessfully, because Tesseire always preferred playing for rugby league clubs.

After his player career, he became coach and international referee, he notably refereed a match between Great Britain and Australia in Perpignan during the 1972 Rugby League World Cup.

In 2003, Teisseire was indicted to the Medal of Youth and Sports by the Minister of Sports and Youth Affairs, Jean-François Lamour.

References

1931 births
Living people
AS Carcassonne coaches
AS Carcassonne players
French rugby league players
France national rugby league team players
French rugby league coaches
French rugby league referees
Lézignan Sangliers players
Limoux Grizzlies coaches
Rugby league halfbacks
Sportspeople from Aude
People from Carcassonne